Qirqqiz (until 2010 Oqshoʻlaq / Оқшўлақ) is an urban-type settlement of Qoʻngʻirot District in Karakalpakstan in Uzbekistan. Its population was 1,000 people in 2000, and 1,200 in 2016.

References

Populated places in Karakalpakstan
Urban-type settlements in Uzbekistan